(literally, "four-point fort") is a fort in the city of Hakodate in southern Hokkaidō, Japan. It was constructed in April 1869, during the Battle of Hakodate, three kilometres to the northeast of Goryōkaku by two hundred soldiers of the former Tokugawa shogunate and a hundred local villagers, likely under the direction of Ōtori Keisuke.  Shiryōkaku  has four bastions , and is sometimes known as the "butterfly fort" as opposed to the "star fort".

The fort covers an area of 21,500 m2, stretching approximately a hundred metres east to west and seventy metres north to south; the earthworks rise to a height of 3 m with a width of 5.4 m; they are surrounded by a dry moat 0.9 m deep and 2.7 m wide; the entrance is to the southwest.

Shiryōkaku fell to government forces within a few hours on 11 May 1869.

In 1934 the area was designated an Historic Site. Repairs were carried out from 1970-2 and again in 1990.

See also

 Ezo Republic
 Boshin War
 List of Historic Sites of Japan (Hokkaidō)
 List of foreign-style castles in Japan

References

Forts in Japan
Historic Sites of Japan
Hakodate
1869 establishments in Japan
19th-century fortifications in Japan